The year 2016 is the 13th year in the history of the Konfrontacja Sztuk Walki, a mixed martial arts promotion based in Poland. In 2016 Konfrontacja Sztuk Walki held 4 events beginning with,  KSW 34: New Order .

List of events

KSW 34: New Order

KSW 34: New Order was a mixed martial arts event held on March 5, 2016, at the Torwar in Warsaw, Poland.

Background

This promotional event was the first of 2016 and was aired on the free TV channel Polsat. Future events in this year will appear on PPV in Poland and the web platform KSW TV worldwide.

Owners of Konfrontacja Sztuk Walki announced that Tomasz Narkun was expected to face Andre Muniz in his first title defense. On February 25, it was announced that Muniz withdrew from the bout due to elbow injury and was replaced by Cassio Barbosa de Oliveira who defeated UFC veteran Ronny Markes two weeks earlier at Shooto Brazil 61.

Łukasz Bieńkowski was expected  to face Svetlozar Savov, but on March 1, it was announced that Bieńkowski pulled out due to injury and Antoni Chmielewski (who was planning to take part in PLMMA 64 on March 18, 2016) was added as a 'last minute' replacement.

One of the scheduled opening fights on the card was a match-up between Grzegorz Szulakowski and Bartłomiej Kurczewski. Szulakowski had to pull out due to an arm injury and there was no replacement for him, so the bout was deleted from the card.

Bonuses:
 Fight of the Night: Karol Bedorf vs. James McSweeney
 Performance of the Night: Tomasz Narkun and Antoni Chmielewski

Results

KSW 35: Khalidov vs. Karaoglu

KSW 35 was a mixed martial arts event held on May 27, 2016, at the Ergo Arena in Gdańsk / Sopot, Poland

Background

The event was initially planned for May 28 but was rescheduled due to a conflict with Polsat's music show Polsat SuperHit Festival 2016 .

This event appeared on PPV (after two opening fights) in Poland and KSW TV worldwide. The Polish organization announced that KSW 35 will be the first event broadcast in VR 360° technology which will be an innovation broadcasting MMA events.

Former UFC fighter and TUF competitor Marcin Wrzosek was expected to face Anzor Azhiev in featherweight title eliminator, but April 1, 2016 KSW announced that Azhiev is injured and Filip Wolański will replace him.

Lukasz Chlewick was expected to fight Marif Piraev, however Piraev was pulled out on May 23. He was replaced by Welsh fighter Azi Thomas.

Results

KSW 36: Materla vs. Palhares

KSW 36 was a mixed martial arts event held on October 1, 2016, at the Hala CRS in Zielona Góra, Poland

Background

Results

KSW 37: Circus of Pain

KSW 37: Circus of Pain is a mixed martial arts event to be held on December 3, 2016, at the Tauron Arena in Krakow, Poland.

Background
Bonus awards:
 
The following fighters will be awarded bonuses:
Fight of the Night: Roman Szymański vs. Sebastian Romanowski
Knockout of the Night: Fernando Rodrigues Jr.
Submission of the Night: Marcin Wójcik
Performance of the Night: Marcin Wrzosek
Performance of the Night: Borys Mańkowski

Results

References

2016 in mixed martial arts
Konfrontacja Sztuk Walki events
Konfrontacja Sztuk Walki events